John Alfred Wasikye was an Anglican bishop in Uganda.

Wasikye was educated at Buwalasi Theological College. He was ordained deacon in 1954 and priest in 1956. He served in the diocese until 1961 and in Mbale from 1961. He was Archdeacon of Bugisu and Sebei from 1965 to 1973; and Dean of Mbale from 1973 to 1976 when he became its bishop. He was killed by forces loyal to president Idi Amin in 1979.

References

20th-century Anglican bishops in Uganda
Anglican bishops of Mbale
Bulwalasi Theological College alumni
Anglican deans in Africa
Anglican archdeacons in Africa